Julien Lepers (whose real name is Ronan Gerval Lepers) is a French television and radio presenter, and a singer-songwriter, born on  in Paris.

Biography

Early life 
Son of the conductor Raymond Lepers and the singer Maria Rémusat, and grandson of the painter Claude Rémusat, Lepers was born in Paris but spent his childhood in Antibes, then in Saint-Dié-des-Vosges. He studied law at the University of Nice Sophia Antipolis, and became licenciate.

Career as a host 
Lepers won a presenter contest organised by Jean-Pierre Foucault at the radio station RMC where he became a radio host, from 1973 to 1978. There, he was Mister Hit parade before moving to RTL.

In the eighties, Lepers was the host for a year of À tout cœur, an entertainment programme broadcast by the Swiss TV channel TSR, which featured famous singers.

He debuted as a television host in France in 1986, at the age of 36, on FR3 in La Nouvelle Affiche, and then in the breakfast television show Télématin on Antenne 2.

From November 1988 until February 2016, Lepers hosted Questions pour un champion, the French version of the game show Going for Gold. The show is on air to this day and is still a success.

In August 1998, Lepers also hosted C'est l'été on France 3.

Musical career 
In 1978 and 1979, Lepers recorded four songs: De retour de vacances, Je t'aime trop, Pleure sous la pluie and Oh! Sylvie.

As a self-taught pianist, keen on music, he is the composer of three hits by French singer, Herbert Léonard: Pour le plaisir in 1981, Amoureux fous (duet with Julie Pietri) in 1983, and Flagrant délit (which became a number-one hit in Quebec) in 1985. He has also written many songs for Sylvie Vartan, Michel Delpech and Sheila.

In June 1996, he recorded an album with the Bratislava Symphonic Orchestra. In parallel with his television career, he continues his career as a musician.

Court cases 
On 4 January 1994, Lepers, suspected of tax avoidance, was given a one-year suspended prison sentence as well as a fine of 150,000 French francs. As a consequence, French presenter Vincent Perrot replaced him as host of Questions pour un champion for a few days.

On 15 April 2010, in Cyril Hanouna's show Touche pas à mon poste! aired on France 4, he said that the tax officials made a mistake, were aware of it, and refunded him soon after the sentence.

Diversification 
In 2009, Lepers appeared in a radio advertisement for Saint-Yorre, a brand of bottled mineral water.

In September 2010, in an interview with French newspaper Le Figaro, Lepers says he would enjoy being a news anchor for France 3. 

In August 2011, Lepers was a jury member for the "Prix Iznogoud" award of the "Humour et Eau Salée" French comedy festival held in Saint-Georges-de-Didonne.

In November 2011, irritated by the misuse of the French language, Lepers published a book with the title Les fautes de Français ? Plus jamais ! (French mistakes? Never again!) in which he says: .

Look-alike 
Lepers is Michael Keaton's look-alike. This resemblance to the American actor prompted a few sketches.

Career

Radio 
 RMC
 Hit Parade
 RTL
 Challenger,
 Studio 22,
 Les Ambassadeurs
 Départ Immédiat
 Casinos Parade
 Une journée pas comme les autres,
 Et pour vous qu'est-ce qu'on peut faire ?
 La vente aux enchères
 Stop ou encore until September 1998

TV 
 France 2 :
 Télématin from 1986 to 1987 then from 1989 to 1990 when William Leymergie couldn't host the programme.
 France 3
 La Nouvelle Affiche in 1986, followed by Philippe Risoli
 Questions pour un champion from 7 November 1988 until 20 February 2016 (also broadcast on TV5Monde)
 Au pied du mur ! in 1992
 Election of Miss France from 1992 to 1995
 C'est l'été in 1998
 Intervilles from 2006 to 2008 with Jean-Christophe Le Texier, Nathalie Simon, Philippe Corti
 Questions pour un super champion since 10 September 2006
 Eurovision Song Contest in 1999 and 2000 (alone), then with Guy Carlier in 2005, with Jean-Christophe Le Texier in 2007 and with Jean Paul Gaultier in 2008
 Le Tournoi d'Orthographe (The Orthograph Tournament) on 22 April 2009
 Globes de Cristal Award on 6 February 2012
 TSR
 À tout coeur
 Lepers also hosted some of the following beauty pageants: Miss Lebanon, Miss Mauritius, Miss Europe, Miss Réunion and Miss Suisse Romande.

Filmography 

Lepers has made several appearances in movies and series where he plays himself.

 1995 : Fantôme avec chauffeur (Ghost with Driver) (directed by Gérard Oury): himself
 2001 : Un gars, une fille – episode Jean repasse le permis: the driving instructor
 2002 : Vu à la télé (directed by Daniel Losset): himself
 2005 : Edy (directed by Stéphan Guérin-Tillié): himself
 2008 : Vilaine (Ugly Melanie) (directed by Jean-Patrick Benes and Allan Mauduit): himself
 2009 : 8th Wonderland (directed by Nicolas Alberny and Jean Mach): himself
 2012 : Fais pas ci, fais pas ça – Fifth season : himself
 2013 : Y'a pas d'âge: himself

Discography 
 Je t'aime trop (1978)
 Pleure sous la pluie (1978)
 De retour de vacances (1979)
 Oh! Sylvie (1979)

Bibliography 
 Les fautes de Français ? Plus jamais !, Éditions Michel Lafon, 2011

See also 

 Questions pour un champion
 France 3

Notes and references

External links 
 Official website of Questions pour un champion

1949 births
Living people
French radio presenters
French television presenters
Mass media people from Paris
French songwriters
Male songwriters
French male singers
Beauty pageant hosts